1st class Active State Councillor of the Russian Federation is the highest federal state civilian service rank of Russia. The following list is a list of all persons who was promoted to this rank during the period 2010–2014:

 Eva Vasilevskaya
 Nikolay Konstantinov
 Alexey Kulakovsky
 Yury Sentyurin
 Vera Chistova
 Pavel Kyunnap
 Nadera Mukhomedzhan
 Sergey Khutortsev
 Andrey Yatskin
 Vladimir Puchkov
 Denis Manturov
 Yekaterina Chukovskaya
 Pavel Novikov
 Sergey Pavlenko
 Konstantin Panferov
 Sergey Aristov
 Alexander Arsenov
 Oleg Bochkarev
 Valery Voskoboynikov
 Yelena Kuleshova
 Konstantin Noskov
 Andrey Chobotov
 Alexander Sukhorukov
 Dmitry Chushkin
 Mikhail Mishustin
 Nikolay Kutiin
 Tatiana Shevtsova
 Viktor Tolokonsky
 Roman Artyukhin
 Dmitry Anosov
 Olga Bursova
 Alexey Konyushkov
 Alexander Yakushev
 Igor Yaremenko
 Anatoly Ledovskikh
 Alexander Safonov
 Nikolay Pankov
 Alexander Surinov
 Dmitry Bezdelov
 Oleg Belozyorov
 Andrey Krotov
 Alexander Khlunov
 Oleg Chepyakov
 Andrey Ulanov
 Andrey Belousov
 Alexey Popov
 Andrey Sharov
 Sergey Gerasimov
 Vladimir Selin
 Yevgeny Kuyvashev
 Konstantin Kostin
 Igor Nagorny
 Alexander Volosov
 Sergei Ivanov
 Pavel Astakhov
 Vyacheslav Volodin
 Mikhail Babich
 Marina Seliverstova
 Yevgeny Zabarchuk
 Vladimir Uyba
 Alexander Davydenko
 Andrey Baklanov
 Oleg Morozov
 Vladislav Kitaev
 Vladimir Kikot
 Mikhail Bryukhanov
 Andrei Fursenko
 Georgy Kalamanov
 Alexey Lavrov
 Yury Trutnev
 Andrei Klepach
 Alexander Gladyshev
 Andrey Komzolov
 Kseniya Yudaeva
 Andrey Lipov
 Dmitry Pankin
 Alexander Frolov
 Semyon Levi
 Nikolay Popov
 Alexey Seregin
 Anton Kobyakov
 Pavel Zenkovich
 Viktor Ivanov
 Alexey Rakhmanov
 Vladimir Kirillov
 Igor Karavaev
 Magomedsalam Magomedov
 Ivan Lobanov
 Elmir Tagirov
 Viktor Kruchinin
 Alexey Zaklyazminsky
 Viktor Dmitriev
 Vladislav Fedulov
 Igor Smirnov
 Vladimir Popovkin
 Dmitry Aristov
 Andrey Soroko
 Fedor Smuglin
 Jeanna Odintsova
 Vladimir Simonenko
 Georgy Verenich
 Alexander Potapov
 Igor Levitin
 Igor Kholmanskikh
 Vitaly Azarov
 Tatyana Blinova
 Yury Borisov
 Oleg Dukhovnitsky
 Igor Zubov
 Grigory Ivliev
 Natalya Parshikova
 Alexey Ferapontov
 Grigory Elkin
 Artur Muravyov
 Yury Averyanov
 Oleg Plokhoy
 Marina Lastochkina
 Yury Mikhaylov
 Alexander Sinenko
 Natalya Antipina
 Anatoly Antonov
 Sergey Velmyaykin
 Dmitry Gogin
 Marat Kambolov
 Alexey Likhachev
 Igor Manylov
 Nadezhda Sinikova
 Irina Antekhina
 Mikhail Buben
 Oleg Belaventsev
 Inna Bilenkina
 Alexander Golublev
 Ilya Yelizarov
 Nikolay Reshetnikov
 Vasily Kopylov
 Konstantin Romodanovsky
 Sergey Melikov
 Nikolay Rogozhkin
 Sergey Shlyakov
 Yelena Shipileva
 Valery Sidorenko
 Dmitry Stupakov
 Andrey Artizov
 Rinat Gizatulin
 Anton Inyutsyn

See also
 State civilian and municipal service ranks in Russian Federation

References

Federal state civilian service ranks in the Russian Federation